The Tsondab River is an ephemeral river in the Hardap Region of central Namibia. Its source is in the Remhoogte Mountains. From there it flows westwards through the Namib-Naukluft National Park before evaporating at Tsondabvlei. Inflows of the Tsondab are Diep,
Noab and Koireb.

References

Rivers of Namibia
Geography of Hardap Region
Namib-Naukluft National Park